John Dennis (1807 – November 1, 1859) was an American politician. Born at "Beckford", near Princess Anne, Maryland, he completed preparatory and law studies. After being admitted to the bar, he commenced the practice of law and also engaged in agricultural pursuits. He served in the Maryland House of Delegates from 1835 to 1836, and was elected as a Whig to the Twenty-fifth and Twenty-sixth Congresses, serving from March 4, 1837, to March 3, 1841. He later served as a delegate to the State constitutional convention of 1850. He died at his place of birth, "Beckford".

Dennis was the son of John Dennis (1771–1806) and cousin of Littleton Purnell Dennis, both of whom also represented Maryland in the Congress.

References

External links
John Dennis And The Election Of 1800 - Delmarva Heritage Series

1807 births
1859 deaths
Members of the Maryland House of Delegates
People from Princess Anne, Maryland
Whig Party members of the United States House of Representatives from Maryland
19th-century American politicians